The Borough of Victoria was a local government area in the Lower North Shore region of Sydney, New South Wales, Australia. First proclaimed as the Victoria Ward of the Borough of St Leonards in 1867, in 1871 a petition to secede was accepted and the Borough was proclaimed with an area of 0.7km2, making it the second-smallest council in Sydney after the Borough of Darlington. It included the modern suburbs of McMahons Point and parts of North Sydney and Lavender Bay. The borough lasted until 29 July 1890 when it merged with the neighbouring boroughs of St Leonards and East St Leonards to form the Borough of North Sydney.

Council history
With the passing of The Municipalities Act, 1858, on 20 January 1866 139 residents of the St Leonards district petitioned the Colonial Government for the incorporation of the area as a "Municipality of Saint Leonards". This petition was subsequently accepted and the Governor of New South Wales, Sir John Young, proclaimed the establishment of the "Municipality of St Leonards" on 31 May 1867. On 24 December 1868 the Borough was divided into wards and the Victoria Ward named after The Queen encompassing Lavender Bay, McMahons Point and North Sydney was created.

However, by mid-1870 a petition of 172 names was presented to the Colonial Secretary asking for the secession of the Victoria Ward and the creation of a separate borough council. The petition was accepted and on 20 January 1871 the Borough of Victoria was proclaimed by the Governor.

Donald Munro, of Blues Point Road, was appointed as Returning Officer for the first election to be held on 10 February 1871. The first council, comprising nine Aldermen and two auditors, was first elected on 10 February 1871, and the first Mayor, Matthew Charlton Jr, was elected on 20 February. Walter George Willington was made the first Council Clerk, a position that was confirmed on 25 February.

The Council met at its Council Chambers in the Council Clerk Willington's "London Store", at 139-141 Blues Point Road, McMahons Point. An 1889 profile of the Borough commented that "the chambers occupied by the council are of the meanest description possible, and as the total rent amounts to little more than £20 per annum, the ratepayers cannot complain of extravagance on the part of their representatives."

The small area of the Borough limited the council's ability to develop public infrastructure, with large areas described in 1889 as being "in a primitive state" and possessing no sewer connections. Alderman Frederick Smith in particular, in a September 1889 debate on amalgamation, noted that "the borough was poverty-stricken and impotent, and the time was ripe for a change", while the Illustrated Sydney News commented that "there are absolutely no lungs to the Borough of Victoria, and the people are forced to wander about the streets if they would enjoy the open air." Representatives from the Borough had met with the neighbouring boroughs of St Leonards and East St Leonards at an amalgamation conference in July 1889.

The Borough lasted until 29 July 1890 when it merged with the Borough of East St Leonards (1860) and the Borough of St Leonards to form the "Borough of North Sydney".

Mayors

Council Clerks

References

Victoria
Victoria
Victoria
Victoria
Victoria